Volodymyr Nechayev (4 August 1950 – 3 May 2021) was a Soviet professional football defender and coach.

Nechayev started at 12 in the sports school (DYuSSh) of SKA Odessa. With Chornomorets and Pakhtakor, Nechayev played some 166 games at the Soviet Top League.

References

External links
 

1950 births
2021 deaths
People from Bilhorod-Dnistrovskyi
Soviet footballers
Ukrainian footballers
Association football defenders
FC Chornomorets Odesa players
SKA Odesa players
Pakhtakor Tashkent FK players
FC Elektrometalurh-NZF Nikopol players
Soviet Top League players
Soviet football managers
Ukrainian football managers
FC Elektrometalurh Nikopol managers
FC Polissya Zhytomyr managers
FC Transmash Mogilev managers
SC Olkom Melitopol managers
FC Enerhiya Yuzhnoukrainsk managers
Ukrainian expatriate football managers
Expatriate football managers in Belarus
Sportspeople from Odesa Oblast